Yoron may refer to:
 Yoronjima, Yorontō, or Yoron Island (与論島), part of Amami Islands in Kagoshima Prefecture, Japan
 , the town that makes up the island
 the Yoron language of Yoronjima